Ernest Lapointe  (October 6, 1876 – November 26, 1941) was a Canadian lawyer and politician.  A member of Parliament from Quebec City, he was a senior minister in the government of Prime Minister W. L. Mackenzie King, playing an important role on issues relating to legal affairs, Quebec and French-speaking Canada.

Education, early career
Lapointe earned his law degree from Laval University. He was called to the bar in 1898 and practised law in Rivière-du-Loup and Quebec City.

Enters politics
Lapointe was elected by acclamation to the House of Commons of Canada for the riding of Kamouraska as a Liberal through a by-election on February 12, 1904. Lapointe was later re-elected in the 1904, 1908, 1911, and 1917 federal elections.

Lapointe resigned his seat in 1919 and successfully ran in the Quebec East seat vacated by former Prime Minister Wilfrid Laurier, who died.

King's cabinet minister and Quebec lieutenant

In 1921, Prime Minister William Lyon Mackenzie King appointed Lapointe to his cabinet as minister of marine and fisheries. During his tenure as minister, Lapointe reduced tariffs. In 1924, Lapointe became minister of justice, and served in that position until the Liberals' defeat at the polls in 1930. However, the Liberals under King returned back to power in the 1935 federal election, and Lapointe once again regained his old post. From 1924 to 1930 as justice minister, Lapointe expressed his support for King's commitment to Canadian autonomy and accompanied him at the Imperial Conference of 1926. Lapointe also chaired the Canadian delegation in the discussions that led to the Statute of Westminster in 1931.

Lapointe served as King's Quebec lieutenant and was one of the most important ministers in Cabinet. King did not speak French; he relied on Lapointe to handle important matters in the province.  Lapointe gave a strong Quebecker voice to the cabinet decision, something that had not existed since the defeat of Laurier in 1911.

In the late 1930s, Lapointe recommended that the federal Cabinet disallow several Acts passed by the Alberta Social Credit government of William Aberhart, arguing that Aberhart was attempting to grab too much power and encroach upon federal jurisdiction.

Lapointe did not recommend disallowance of the Padlock Act passed by the Quebec government of Maurice Duplessis, fearing that doing so would only aid the Union Nationale government.

Conscription issue

Lapointe helped draft Mackenzie King's policy against conscription for overseas service in 1939, and his campaigning helped defeat the Duplessis provincial government in 1939. During the 1939 provincial election, Lapointe made many speeches in the province of Quebec, in which he argued that if Duplessis was to be re-elected, every French Canadian minister would resign from the federal cabinet, leaving it without a francophone voice. Having been a Liberal MP during the 1917 conscription crisis, Lapointe knew how much a new crisis like the last one would destroy the national unity that Mackenzie King had tried to build since 1921. Duplessis lost in a landslide to Liberal Party of Quebec leader Adélard Godbout, who sought to co-operate with the federal government.

Death
Lapointe died in office in 1941, in the midst of the war. King decided to appoint the reluctant Quebec leading lawyer Louis St. Laurent to the cabinet as the new minister of justice.

Lapointe's son, Hugues Lapointe, served as a member of parliament from 1940 to 1957 and lieutenant governor of Quebec from 1966 to 1978.

Further reading
 Betcherman, Lita-Rose. Ernest Lapointe: Mackenzie King's Great Quebec Lieutenant (2002). 435 pp.
 MacFarlane, John. Ernest Lapointe and Quebec's influence on Canadian foreign policy (U of Toronto Press, 1999)
 Neatby, H. Blair. "Mackenzie King and French Canada." Journal of Canadian Studies 11.1 (1976): 3+

Archives 
There is an Ernest Lapointe fonds at Library and Archives Canada.

Electoral record

See also
 Conscription Crisis of 1944

References

Bibliography

 
Biography from Library and Archives Canada

1876 births
1941 deaths
Liberal Party of Canada MPs
Laurier Liberals
Members of the House of Commons of Canada from Quebec
Members of the King's Privy Council for Canada
Lawyers in Quebec
Quebec lieutenants
Persons of National Historic Significance (Canada)
Canadian members of the Privy Council of the United Kingdom
Université Laval alumni